Lew Sapieha (4 April 1557 – 7 July 1633) was a nobleman and statesman of the Polish–Lithuanian Commonwealth. He became Great Secretary of the Grand Duchy of Lithuania in 1580, Great Clerk of the Grand Duchy in 1581, Crown Chancellor in 1585, Grand Chancellor from 1589 until 1623, Voivode of Vilnius in 1621, Great Lithuanian Hetman in 1623 and governor of Slonim, Brest and Mogilev.

Sapieha is considered as a great political figure of the Commonwealth. A rich and powerful magnate, he was known for his wisdom as a statesman, lawyer and military commander, he was one of the greatest leaders of the Grand Duchy of Lithuania at the times of the Duchy's highest cultural flourishing. He was of Ruthenian ethnicity. Modern Belarusian sources interpret his Ruthenian heritage as Belarusian, however many facts presented by the modern Belarusian sources about the Grand Duchy of Lithuania are often distorted and unanimously not recognized by Lithuanian and Polish historians.

Biography

Early life
He was born in Astroŭna, near Vitebsk. He was educated in Leipzig and worked in the royal chancellery of King of Poland and Grand Duke of Lithuania Stephen Báthory under direction of Jan Zamoyski. Raised Eastern Orthodox, in his youth he converted to Calvinism and founded a number of Calvinist churches in his former estates. In the 1570s he turned to Unitarianism. Disillusioned by the squabbles within the Protestant camp, in 1586 he converted with his first wife to Roman Catholicism of which he became a zealous defender. After the Union of Brest he enforced conformity on the unwilling Eastern Orthodox.

Career and politics

He supported a political union with Muscovy in 1584–1600 and led the diplomatic mission to Moscow in 1600 that proposed the union to tzar Boris Godunov, who declined the proposal. He also participated in wars with Muscovy under rule of Stephen Báthory and King of Poland and Grand Duke of Lithuania Sigismund III Vasa. He became an adviser of Sigismund III and supported his radical plans to take over the Muscovite throne and reclaim Smolensk by force.

He participated in establishing the Lithuanian Tribunal in 1578.

As Chancellor he was the main editor and publisher of the last version of the Statute of the Grand Duchy of Lithuania. He laid grounds for the establishment of the Law Faculty in the University of Vilnius, which was created in 1641.

He was co-initiator and a participant in the military expedition to Moscow in 1618 by King of Poland and Grand Duke of Lithuania Władysław IV.

As Sejm Marshal he led the ordinary Sejm in Warsaw from 4 October to 25 November 1582. He was a benefactor of many catholic churches in the Grand Duchy. He established the long-term power and wealth of the Sapieha family.

Sapieha died on 1633 and was interred in the cellars of the Church of St. Michael the Archangel in Vilnius, which he himself commissioned. His tomb remains there to the present day and is still the largest piece of art of its kind in the territory of Lithuania.

Gallery

References

1557 births
1633 deaths
People from Beshankovichy District
Lew
Ruthenian nobility of the Polish–Lithuanian Commonwealth
Former Polish Orthodox Christians
Former Calvinist and Reformed Christians
Converts to Protestantism from Eastern Orthodoxy
Converts to Calvinism
Converts to Unitarianism
Converts to Roman Catholicism from Calvinism
Secular senators of the Polish–Lithuanian Commonwealth
Members of the Sejm of the Polish–Lithuanian Commonwealth
Polish people of the Polish–Muscovite War (1605–1618)
Great Hetmans of the Grand Duchy of Lithuania
Grand Chancellors of the Grand Duchy of Lithuania
Deputy Chancellors of the Grand Duchy of Lithuania
Voivode of Vilnius